William de Moray (died c. 1304), Lord of Drumsagard, was a Scottish noble.

He was a son of Andrew Moray, Justiciar of Scotia. He was a signatory to the Treaty of Salisbury and swore fealty to Edward I of England in 1296 and 1304. He was succeeded by his son John.

References
Paul, James Balfour. The Scots Peerage: Founded On Wood's ed. of Sir Robert Douglas's Peerage of Scotland; Containing An Historical And Genealogical Account of The Nobility of That Kingdom. Edinburgh: Douglas (1904) Moray, Earl of Strathearn, Vol. VIII, pp. 255–8.

13th-century Scottish people
14th-century Scottish people
Moray
De Moravia family
Clan Murray
13th-century births
1300s deaths
Year of birth unknown
Year of death uncertain